A list of populated places in Ankara Province, Turkey by district:

Akyurt

Ahmetadil, Akyurt
Akyurt, Ankara
Balıkhisar, Akyurt
Bozca, Akyurt
Büğdüz, Akyurt
Cücük, Akyurt
Doğanoluk, Akyurt
Elecik, Akyurt
Güzelhisar, Akyurt
Haydar, Akyurt
Karacakaya, Akyurt
Karacalar, Akyurt
Karayatak, Akyurt
Kozayağı, Akyurt
Kızık, Akyurt
Saracalar, Akyurt
Uzunlar, Akyurt
Çam, Akyurt
Çardakbağı, Akyurt
Çınar, Akyurt
Şeyhler, Akyurt

Ayaş

Akkaya, Ayaş
Ayaş
Bayat, Ayaş
Başayaş, Ayaş
Başbereket, Ayaş
Evci, Ayaş
Feruz, Ayaş
Gençali, Ayaş
Gökler, Ayaş
Gökçebağ, Ayaş
Ilıca, Ayaş
Ortabereket, Ayaş
Pınaryaka, Ayaş
Sinanlı, Ayaş
Tekkeköy, Ayaş
Ulupınar, Ayaş
Uğurçayırı, Ayaş
Yağmurdede, Ayaş
Çanıllı, Ayaş
İlhan, Ayaş

Bala

Abazlı, Bala
Afşar, Bala
Ahmetçayırı, Bala
Akarlar, Bala
Akörençarşak, Bala
Altınçanak, Bala
Aydoğan, Bala
Aşağıhacıbekir, Bala
Aşıkoğlu, Bala
Bahçekaradalak, Bala
Balâ
Bağiçi, Bala
Bektaşlı, Bala
Belçarsak, Bala
Beynam, Bala
Buyukdavdanlı, Bala
Büyükboyalık, Bala
Büyükbıyık, Bala
Büyükcamili, Bala
Davdanlı, Bala
Derekışla, Bala
Erdemli, Bala
Ergin, Bala
Evciler, Bala
Eğribasan, Bala
Gülbağı, Bala
Hanburun, Bala
Karahamzalı, Bala
Keklicek, Bala
Kerişli, Bala
Kesikköprü, Bala
Koçyayla, Bala
Kömürcü, Bala
Köseli, Bala
Küçükbayat, Bala
Küçükboyalık, Bala
Küçükbıyık, Bala
Küçükcamili, Bala
Sarıhüyük, Bala
Sehrıban, Bala
Sofular, Bala
Suyugüzel, Bala
Sırapınar, Bala
Tatarhüyük, Bala
Tepeköy, Bala
Tolköy, Bala
Yaylaköy, Bala
Yaylalıözü, Bala
Yeniköy, Bala
Yeniyapançarşak, Bala
Yeniyapanşeyhli, Bala
Yukarıhacıbekir, Bala
Yöreli, Bala
Çatalçeşme, Bala
Çatalören, Bala
Çiğdemli, Bala
Üçem, Bala
Şehriban, Bala

Beypazarı

Acısu, Beypazarı
Adaören, Beypazarı
Akçakavak, Beypazarı
Akçalı, Beypazarı
Aşağıgüney, Beypazarı
Batça, Beypazarı
Bağözü, Beypazarı
Başören, Beypazarı
Beypazarı
Boyalı, Beypazarı
Dağşeyhler, Beypazarı
Dereli, Beypazarı
Dibecik, Beypazarı
Dibekören, Beypazarı
Dikmen, Beypazarı
Doğanyurt, Beypazarı
Doğançalı, Beypazarı
Dudaş, Beypazarı
Fasıl, Beypazarı
Geyikpınarı, Beypazarı
Gürsöğüt, Beypazarı
Harmancık, Beypazarı
Haydarlar, Beypazarı
Hırkatepe, Beypazarı
Kabaca, Beypazarı
Kabalar, Beypazarı
Kaplan, Beypazarı
Kapullu, Beypazarı
Karacaören, Beypazarı
Karaören, Beypazarı
Karaşar, Beypazarı
Kargı, Beypazarı
Kayabükü, Beypazarı
Kerbanlar, Beypazarı
Kozalan, Beypazarı
Kozağaç, Beypazarı
Kurtkovan, Beypazarı
Kuyucak, Beypazarı
Kuyumcutekke, Beypazarı
Köseler, Beypazarı
Köstköy, Beypazarı
Kırbaşı, Beypazarı
Kırşeyhler, Beypazarı
Kızılcasöğüt, Beypazarı
Macun, Beypazarı
Mahmutlar, Beypazarı
Mençeler, Beypazarı
Mikail, Beypazarı
Nuhhoca, Beypazarı
Oymaağaç, Beypazarı
Sarıağıl, Beypazarı
Sekli, Beypazarı
Sopçaalan, Beypazarı
Tacettin, Beypazarı
Tahir, Beypazarı
Uruş, Beypazarı
Uşakgöl, Beypazarı
Yalnızçam, Beypazarı
Yiğerler, Beypazarı
Yoğunpelit, Beypazarı
Yukarıgüney, Beypazarı
Yukarıulucak, Beypazarı
Yıldız, Beypazarı
Çakıloba, Beypazarı
Çantırlı, Beypazarı
Üreğil, Beypazarı
İncepelit, Beypazarı

Elmadağ

Akçaali, Elmadağ
Aşağıkamışlı, Elmadağ
Deliler, Elmadağ
Ediğe, Elmadağ
Elmadağ, Ankara
Karacahasan, Elmadağ
Kayadibi, Elmadağ
Kuşçuali, Elmadağ
Süleymanlı, Elmadağ
Taburlar, Elmadağ
Tekkeköy, Elmadağ
Yukarıkamışlı, Elmadağ

Evren

Altınbaşak, Evren
Cebirli, Evren
Demirayak, Evren
Solakuşağı, Evren
Torunobası, Evren
Yusufuşağı, Evren
Çatalpınar, Evren
İbrahimbeyli, Evren
İnebeyli, Evren

Gölbaşı

Ahiboz, Gölbaşı
Ballıkpınar, Gölbaşı
Bezirhane, Gölbaşı
Dikilitaş, Gölbaşı
Gökçehüyük, Gölbaşı
Gölbaşı, Ankara
Gölbek, Gölbaşı
Günalan, Gölbaşı
Hacıhasan, Gölbaşı
Hacımuratlı, Gölbaşı
Hallaçlı, Gölbaşı
Karaali, Gölbaşı
Karacaören, Gölbaşı
Karagedik, Gölbaşı
Karaoğlan, Gölbaşı
Koparan, Gölbaşı
Kırıklı, Gölbaşı
Kızılcaşar, Gölbaşı
Mahmatlı, Gölbaşı
Mahmatlıbahçe, Gölbaşı
Oyaca, Gölbaşı
Oğulbey, Gölbaşı
Selametli, Gölbaşı
Soğulcak, Gölbaşı
Subaşı, Gölbaşı
Taşpınar, Gölbaşı
Tepeyurt, Gölbaşı
Topaklı, Gölbaşı
Tulumtaş, Gölbaşı
Velihimmetli, Gölbaşı
Yavrucak, Gölbaşı
Yaylabağ, Gölbaşı
Yağlıpınar, Gölbaşı
Yurtbeyi, Gölbaşı
Çayırlı, Gölbaşı
Çeltek, Gölbaşı
Çimşit, Gölbaşı
Örencik, Gölbaşı
İkizce, Gölbaşı
İncek, Gölbaşı

Güdül

Adalıkuzu, Güdül
Afşar, Güdül
Akbaş, Güdül
Akçakese, Güdül
Boyalı, Güdül
Garipçe, Güdül
Güdül, Ankara
Güzel, Güdül
Hacılar, Güdül
Kadıobası, Güdül
Kamanlar, Güdül
Karacaören, Güdül
Kavaközü, Güdül
Kayı, Güdül
Kırkkavak, Güdül
Meyvabükü, Güdül
Salihler, Güdül
Sapanlı, Güdül
Sorgun, Güdül
Tahtacıörencik, Güdül
Taşören, Güdül
Yelli, Güdül
Yeşilöz, Güdül
Çağa, Güdül
Çukurören, Güdül
Özköy, Güdül
Özçaltı, Güdül

Haymana

Ahırlıkuyu, Haymana
Aktepe, Haymana
Alahacılı, Haymana
Altıpınar, Haymana
Ataköy, Haymana
Bahçecik, Haymana
Balçıkhisar, Haymana
Bostanhüyük, Haymana
Boyalık, Haymana
Boğazkaya, Haymana
Bumsuz, Haymana
Büyükkonakgörmez, Haymana
Büyükyağcı, Haymana
Cihanşah, Haymana
Cingirli, Haymana
Culuk, Haymana
Demirözü, Haymana
Dereköy, Haymana
Deveci, Hayamana
Deveci, Haymana
Devecipınarı, Haymana
Durupınar, Haymana
Durutlar, Haymana
Emirler, Haymana
Esen, Haymana
Eskikışla, Haymana
Evci, Haymana
Evliyafakı, Haymana
Gedik, Haymana
Gedikli, Haymana
Güzelcekale, Haymana
Haymana
Karahoca, Haymana
Karapınar, Haymana
Karasüleymanlı, Haymana
Karaömerli, Haymana
Katrancı, Haymana
Kavakköy, Haymana
Kerpiçköy, Haymana
Kesikkavak, Haymana
Kirazoğlu, Haymana
Kutluhan, Haymana
Küçükkonakgörmez, Haymana
Küçükyağcı, Haymana
Kızılkoyunlu, Haymana
Pınarbaşı, Haymana
Saatli, Haymana
Sarıdeğirmen, Haymana
Sarıgöl, Haymana
Sazağası, Haymana
Serinyayla, Haymana
Sinanlı, Haymana
Sincik, Haymana
Sindiran, Haymana
Soğulca, Haymana
Söğüttepe, Haymana
Sırçasaray, Haymana
Tabaklı, Haymana
Tepeköy, Haymana
Toyçayırı, Haymana
Türkhüyük, Haymana
Türkşerefli, Haymana
Yamak, Haymana
Yaprakbayırı, Haymana
Yaylabeyi, Haymana
Yeniköy, Haymana
Yergömü, Haymana
Yeşilköy, Haymana
Yeşilyurt, Haymana
Yukarısebil, Haymana
Yurtbeyli, Haymana
Çalış, Haymana
Çayraz, Haymana
Çeltikli, Haymana
İncirli, Haymana
Şerefligöközü, Haymana

Kalecik

Afşar, Kalecik
Akkaynak, Kalecik
Akkuzulu, Kalecik
Aktepe, Kalecik
Akçataş, Kalecik
Alibeyli, Kalecik
Altıntaş, Kalecik
Arkbörk, Kalecik
Beykavağı, Kalecik
Buğra, Kalecik
Dağdemir, Kalecik
Demirtaş, Kalecik
Değirmenkaya, Kalecik
Elmapınar, Kalecik
Eskiköy, Kalecik
Eşmedere, Kalecik
Gökdere, Kalecik
Gökçeören, Kalecik
Gölköy, Kalecik
Gümüşpınar, Kalecik
Hacıköy, Kalecik
Hancılı, Kalecik
Hasayaz, Kalecik
Kalecik, Ankara
Karahüyük, Kalecik
Karalar, Kalecik
Karatepe, Kalecik
Kargın, Kalecik
Keklicek, Kalecik
Koyunbaba, Kalecik
Kuyucak, Kalecik
Kılçak, Kalecik
Kınık, Kalecik
Kızılkaya, Kalecik
Mahmutlar, Kalecik
Samanlıkköy, Kalecik
Satılarköy, Kalecik
Tavşancık, Kalecik
Tilkiköy, Kalecik
Uyurca, Kalecik
Yalımköy, Kalecik
Yeniçöte, Kalecik
Yeşilöz, Kalecik
Yurtyenice, Kalecik
Yüzbeyli, Kalecik
Yılanlı, Kalecik
Çandır, Kalecik
Çaykaya, Kalecik
Çiftlikköy, Kalecik
Şemsettinköy, Kalecik
Şeyhmahmut, Kalecik

Kazan

Ahi, Kazan
Akçaören, Kazan
Alpagut, Kazan
Aşağıkaraören, Kazan
Aydın, Kazan
Bitik, Kazan
Ciğir, Kazan
Dağyaka, Kazan
Dutözü, Kazan
Emirgazi, Kazan
Fethiye, Kazan
Günbaşı, Kazan
Güvenç, Kazan
Karalar, Kazan
Kazan, Ankara
Kumpınar, Kazan
Kılıçlar, Kazan
Kınık, Kazan
Kışla, Kazan
Orhaniye, Kazan
Örencik, Kazan
Peçenek, Kazan
Sancar, Kazan
Saray, Kazan
Sarıayak, Kazan
Sarılar, Kazan
Soğulcak, Kazan
Tekke, Kazan
Uçarı, Kazan
Yakupderviş, Kazan
Yassıören, Kazan
Yayalar, Kazan
Yazıbeyli, Kazan
Çalta, Kazan
Çimşit, Kazan
İmrendi, Kazan
İnceğiz, Kazan
İne, Kazan
İymir, Kazan
İçören, Kazan

Kızılcahamam

Adaköy, Kızılcahamam
Akdoğan, Kızılcahamam
Aksak, Kızılcahamam
Alibey, Kızılcahamam
Alpagut, Kızılcahamam
Ayvacık, Kızılcahamam
Aşağıadaköy, Kızılcahamam
Aşağıhüyük, Kızılcahamam
Aşağıkese, Kızılcahamam
Aşağıçanlı, Kızılcahamam
Bademli, Kızılcahamam
Balcılar, Kızılcahamam
Bayırköy, Kızılcahamam
Bağlıca, Kızılcahamam
Bağören, Kızılcahamam
Başağaç, Kızılcahamam
Başören, Kızılcahamam
Belpınar, Kızılcahamam
Berçinyayalar, Kızılcahamam
Berçinçatak, Kızılcahamam
Bezcikuzören, Kızılcahamam
Beşkonak, Kızılcahamam
Binkoz, Kızılcahamam
Bulak, Kızılcahamam
Ciğirler, Kızılcahamam
Demirciören, Kızılcahamam
Değirmenönü, Kızılcahamam
Doymuşören, Kızılcahamam
Doğanözü, Kızılcahamam
Esenler, Kızılcahamam
Eğerlialören, Kızılcahamam
Eğerlibaşköy, Kızılcahamam
Eğerlidereköy, Kızılcahamam
Eğerlikozören, Kızılcahamam
Gebeler, Kızılcahamam
Gökbel, Kızılcahamam
Gölköy, Kızılcahamam
Gümele, Kızılcahamam
Güneysaray, Kızılcahamam
Güvem, Kızılcahamam
Hıdırlar, Kızılcahamam
Kalemler, Kızılcahamam
Karaağaç, Kızılcahamam
Karacaören, Kızılcahamam
Kasımlar, Kızılcahamam
Kavaközü, Kızılcahamam
Kocalar, Kızılcahamam
Kurumcu, Kızılcahamam
Kuşcuören, Kızılcahamam
Kınık (Aşağı), Kızılcahamam
Kınık (Yukarı), Kızılcahamam
Kırköy, Kızılcahamam
Kırkırca, Kızılcahamam
Kızık, Kızılcahamam
Kızılca, Kızılcahamam
Kızılcahamam
Kızılcaören, Kızılcahamam
Kışlak, Kızılcahamam
Mahkemeağcin, Kızılcahamam
Olucak, Kızılcahamam
Ortaköy, Kızılcahamam
Otacı, Kızılcahamam
Oğlakçı, Kızılcahamam
P.başören, Kızılcahamam
Pazar, Kızılcahamam
Salın, Kızılcahamam
Saraycık, Kızılcahamam
Sarayköy, Kızılcahamam
Saraçköy, Kızılcahamam
Sazak, Kızılcahamam
Semeler, Kızılcahamam
Semer, Kızılcahamam
Süleler, Kızılcahamam
Tahtalar, Kızılcahamam
Taşlıca, Kızılcahamam
Turnalı, Kızılcahamam
Ugurlu, Kızılcahamam
Yakakaya, Kızılcahamam
Yanık, Kızılcahamam
Yağcıhüseyin, Kızılcahamam
Yeni Dereneci, Kızılcahamam
Yeşilköy, Kızılcahamam
Yukarıhüyük, Kızılcahamam
Yukarıkaraören, Kızılcahamam
Yukarıkese, Kızılcahamam
Yukarıçanlı, Kızılcahamam
Yıldırımdemirciler, Kızılcahamam
Yıldırımhacılar, Kızılcahamam
Yıldırımyağlıca, Kızılcahamam
Yıldırımçatak, Kızılcahamam
Yıldırımören, Kızılcahamam
Çalta, Kızılcahamam
Çavuşlar, Kızılcahamam
Çeltikçi, Kızılcahamam
Çeçtepe, Kızılcahamam
Çukurca, Kızılcahamam
Çukurören, Kızılcahamam
Çırpan, Kızılcahamam
Örencik, Kızılcahamam
Üyücek, Kızılcahamam
Üçbaş, Kızılcahamam
İnceğiz, Kızılcahamam
İyceler, Kızılcahamam
İğdir, Kızılcahamam
İğmir, Kızılcahamam
Şahinler, Kızılcahamam

Nallıhan

Akdere, Nallıhan
Aksu, Nallıhan
Alanköy, Nallıhan
Aliefe, Nallıhan
Alpağut, Nallıhan
Arkutça, Nallıhan
Atça, Nallıhan
Aydoğmuş, Nallıhan
Aşağıbağdere, Nallıhan
Aşağıbağlıca, Nallıhan
Aşağıkavacık, Nallıhan
Belenalan, Nallıhan
Belenören, Nallıhan
Beyalan, Nallıhan
Beycik, Nallıhan
Beydili, Nallıhan
Bozyaka, Nallıhan
Cendere, Nallıhan
Danişment, Nallıhan
Davutoğlan, Nallıhan
Demirköy, Nallıhan
Dereköy, Nallıhan
Doğandere, Nallıhan
Döğmeci, Nallıhan
Emremsultan, Nallıhan
Epçeler, Nallıhan
Ericek, Nallıhan
Eymir, Nallıhan
Eğriköy, Nallıhan
Gökçeöz, Nallıhan
Güzelöz, Nallıhan
Hacıhasanlar, Nallıhan
Hıdırlar, Nallıhan
Kabaca, Nallıhan
Kadıköy, Nallıhan
Karacasu, Nallıhan
Karahisar, Nallıhan
Karahisargölcük, Nallıhan
Karahisarkozlu, Nallıhan
Karaköy, Nallıhan
Kavakköy, Nallıhan
Kulu, Nallıhan
Kuruca, Nallıhan
Kuzucular, Nallıhan
Meyildere, Nallıhan
Meyilhacılar, Nallıhan
Nallıdere, Nallıhan
Nallıgölcük, Nallıhan
Nallıhan
Nebioğlu, Nallıhan
Osmanköy, Nallıhan
Ozanköy, Nallıhan
Sarıkaya, Nallıhan
Soğukkuyu, Nallıhan
Subaşı, Nallıhan
Tekirler, Nallıhan
Tekkeköy, Nallıhan
Tepeköy, Nallıhan
Uluhan, Nallıhan
Uluköy, Nallıhan
Uzunöz, Nallıhan
Yakapınar, Nallıhan
Yenice, Nallıhan
Yeşilyurt, Nallıhan
Yukarıbağdere, Nallıhan
Yukarıbağlıca, Nallıhan
Yukarıkavacık, Nallıhan
Çalıcaalan, Nallıhan
Çamalan, Nallıhan
Çayırhan, Nallıhan
Çiller, Nallıhan
Çive, Nallıhan
Çulhalar, Nallıhan
Ömerşeyhler, Nallıhan
Öşürler, Nallıhan
İslamalanı, Nallıhan

Polatlı

Adatoprakpınar, Polatlı
Avdanlı, Polatlı
Avşar, Polatlı
Babayakup, Polatlı
Basri, Polatlı
Beyceğiz, Polatlı
Beylikköprü, Polatlı
Beşköprü, Polatlı
Eskikarsak, Polatlı
Eskiköseler, Polatlı
Eskipolatlı, Polatlı
Gedikli, Polatlı
Gençali, Polatlı
Gülpınar, Polatlı
Gümüşyaka, Polatlı
Gündoğan, Polatlı
Güreş, Polatlı
Hacımusa, Polatlı
Hacımuslu, Polatlı
Hacıosmanoğlu, Polatlı
Hacıtuğrul, Polatlı
Hıdırşeyh, Polatlı
Ilıca, Polatlı
Kabakköy, Polatlı
Karaahmet, Polatlı
Karabenli, Polatlı
Karacaahmet, Polatlı
Karahamzalı, Polatlı
Karailyas, Polatlı
Karakaya, Polatlı
Karakuyu, Polatlı
Karapınar, Polatlı
Karayavşan, Polatlı
Kargalı, Polatlı
Kayabaşı, Polatlı
Kocahacılı, Polatlı
Kuşçu, Polatlı
Kıranharmanı, Polatlı
Kızılcakışla, Polatlı
Macun, Polatlı
Müslüm, Polatlı
Olukpınar, Polatlı
Oğuzlar, Polatlı
Polatlı
Poyraz, Polatlı
Sabanca, Polatlı
Sakarya, Polatlı
Sarıhalil, Polatlı
Sarıoba, Polatlı
Sazlar, Polatlı
Sinanlı, Polatlı
Sincik, Polatlı
Sivri, Polatlı
Tatlıkuyu, Polatlı
Taşpınar, Polatlı
Toydemir, Polatlı
Tüfekçioğlu, Polatlı
Türkkarsak, Polatlı
Türktaciri, Polatlı
Uzunbeyli, Polatlı
Yaralı, Polatlı
Yassıhüyük, Polatlı
Yağcıoğlu, Polatlı
Yağmurbaba, Polatlı
Yenice, Polatlı
Yenidoğan, Polatlı
Yeniköseler, Polatlı
Yenimehmetli, Polatlı
Yeşilöz, Polatlı
Yüzükbaşı, Polatlı
Yıldızlı, Polatlı
Çanakçı, Polatlı
Çekirdeksiz, Polatlı
Çimenceğiz, Polatlı
Ömerler, Polatlı
Ördekgölü, Polatlı
Özyurt, Polatlı
Üçpınar, Polatlı
İğciler, Polatlı
Şabanözü, Polatlı
Şeyhahmetli, Polatlı
Şeyhali, Polatlı

Çamlıdere

Ahatlar, Çamlıdere
Akkaya, Çamlıdere
Alakoç, Çamlıdere
Atça, Çamlıdere
Avdan, Çamlıdere
Avşarlar, Çamlıdere
Bardakçılar, Çamlıdere
Bayındır, Çamlıdere
Buğralar, Çamlıdere
Bükeler, Çamlıdere
Dağkuzören, Çamlıdere
Doymuş, Çamlıdere
Doğancı, Çamlıdere
Doğanlar, Çamlıdere
Eldelek, Çamlıdere
Elmalı, Çamlıdere
Elvanlar, Çamlıdere
Elören, Çamlıdere
Gümele, Çamlıdere
Güney, Çamlıdere
Kuyubaşı, Çamlıdere
Kuşçular, Çamlıdere
Meşeler, Çamlıdere
Muzrupağacın, Çamlıdere
Müsellim, Çamlıdere
Osmansin, Çamlıdere
Ozmuş, Çamlıdere
Pelitçik, Çamlıdere
Sarıkavak, Çamlıdere
Tatlak, Çamlıdere
Yahşihan, Çamlıdere
Yediören, Çamlıdere
Yoncatepe, Çamlıdere
Yılanlı, Çamlıdere
Çamköy, Çamlıdere
Çamlıdere, Ankara
Çukurören, Çamlıdere
Örenköy, Çamlıdere
İnceöz, Çamlıdere

Çubuk

Abadan, Çubuk
Akbayır, Çubuk
Akkuzulu, Çubuk
Avcıova, Çubuk
Ağılcık, Çubuk
Aşağıemirler, Çubuk
Aşağıobruk, Çubuk
Aşağıçavundur, Çubuk
Camili, Çubuk
Dalyasan, Çubuk
Dağkalfat, Çubuk
Dedeler, Çubuk
Demirci, Çubuk
Dumlupınar, Çubuk
Durhasan, Çubuk
Esenboğa, Çubuk
Eskiçöte, Çubuk
Eğriekin, Çubuk
Gökçedere, Çubuk
Güldarbı, Çubuk
Gümüşyayla, Çubuk
Hacılar, Çubuk
Kapaklı, Çubuk
Karaağaç, Çubuk
Karadana, Çubuk
Karaköy, Çubuk
Karaman, Çubuk
Karataş, Çubuk
Karaçam, Çubuk
Kargın, Çubuk
Karşıyaka, Çubuk
Kavaklı, Çubuk
Kuruçay, Çubuk
Kutuören, Çubuk
Kuyumcuköy, Çubuk
Kösrelik, Çubuk
Kösrelikkızığı, Çubuk
Küçükali, Çubuk
Kızılca, Çubuk
Kızılören, Çubuk
Kızılöz, Çubuk
Kışlacık, Çubuk
Mahmutoğlan, Çubuk
Melikşah, Çubuk
Meşeli, Çubuk
Mutlu, Çubuk
Nusratlar, Çubuk
Okçular, Çubuk
Ovacık, Çubuk
Oyumiğde, Çubuk
Saraycık, Çubuk
Sarıkoz, Çubuk
Sarısu, Çubuk
Sele, Çubuk
Sirkeli, Çubuk
Susuz, Çubuk
Sünlü, Çubuk
Sığırlıhacı, Çubuk
Tahtayazı, Çubuk
Taşpınar, Çubuk
Tuğlaköy, Çubuk
Uluağaç, Çubuk
Yakuphasan, Çubuk
Yaylak, Çubuk
Yazlıca, Çubuk
Yazır, Çubuk
Yenice, Çubuk
Yeşilkent, Çubuk
Yiğitli, Çubuk
Yukarıemirler, Çubuk
Yukarıobruk, Çubuk
Yukarıçavundur, Çubuk
Yuva, Çubuk
Yıldırımaydoğan, Çubuk
Yıldırımelören, Çubuk
Yıldırımevci, Çubuk
Yılmazköy, Çubuk
Çatköy, Çubuk
Çitköy, Çubuk
Çubuk, Ankara
Ömercik, Çubuk
Özlüce, Çubuk
İkipınar, Çubuk
İmamhüseyin, Çubuk

Şereflikoçhisar

Acıkuyu, Şereflikoçhisar
Acıöz, Şereflikoçhisar
Akarca, Şereflikoçhisar
Akin, Şereflikoçhisar
Aktaş, Şereflikoçhisar
Aliuşağı, Şereflikoçhisar
Baltalı, Şereflikoçhisar
Bağobası, Şereflikoçhisar
Büyükdamlacık, Şereflikoçhisar
Büyükkışla, Şereflikoçhisar
Deliler, Şereflikoçhisar
Devekovan, Şereflikoçhisar
Değirmenyolu, Şereflikoçhisar
Doğankaya, Şereflikoçhisar
Eley, Şereflikoçhisar
Fadıllı, Şereflikoçhisar
Geçitli, Şereflikoçhisar
Hacıbektaşlı, Şereflikoçhisar
Hamzalı, Şereflikoçhisar
Haydarlı, Şereflikoçhisar
Kadıncık, Şereflikoçhisar
Kadıobası, Şereflikoçhisar
Karabük, Şereflikoçhisar
Karamollauşağı, Şereflikoçhisar
Karandere, Şereflikoçhisar
Kaçarlı, Şereflikoçhisar
Kurutlutepe, Şereflikoçhisar
Küçükdamlacık, Şereflikoçhisar
Musular, Şereflikoçhisar
Odunboğazı, Şereflikoçhisar
Palazobası, Şereflikoçhisar
Sadıklı, Şereflikoçhisar
Seymenli, Şereflikoçhisar
Vayvay, Şereflikoçhisar
Yanlızpınar, Şereflikoçhisar
Yazısöğüt, Şereflikoçhisar
Yeşilyurt, Şereflikoçhisar
Yusufkuyusu, Şereflikoçhisar
Çalören, Şereflikoçhisar
Çatçat, Şereflikoçhisar
Çavuşköy, Şereflikoçhisar
Çayırönü, Şereflikoçhisar
Çıngıl, Şereflikoçhisar
Üzengilik, Şereflikoçhisar
Şanlıkışla, Şereflikoçhisar
Şekerköy, Şereflikoçhisar
Şereflidavutlu, Şereflikoçhisar
Şereflikoçhisar
Şeyhli, Şereflikoçhisar

Recent development

According to Law act no 6360, all Turkish provinces with a population more than 750 000, were renamed as metropolitan municipality. All districts in those provinces became second level municipalities and all villages in those districts  were renamed as a neighborhoods . Thus the villages listed above are officially neighborhoods of Ankara.

External links
Turkstat

populated places
Ankara
List